Girija is a village in Vilnius District Municipality, Lithuania. According to the 2011 census, it had population of 9.

The only Geographical Centre of Europe recognized by the Guinness Book of World Records is located in Girija.

References

Villages in Vilnius County
Vilnius District Municipality